Yeoh Kay Ee is a Malaysian male badminton player.

Career
He participated at the 2014 India Open Grand Prix Gold, 2014 New Zealand Open Grand Prix, 2014 Macau Open Grand Prix Gold, 2015 Chinese Taipei Masters Grand Prix and at the 2016 Thailand Open Grand Prix Gold. He also played at the 2016 China International Challenge, 2015 Bahrain International Challenge, at the 2015 OUE Singapore International Series and at the 2012 Smiling Fish International Series. At the Victor-Rayan Sports Bahrain International Series 2015 he reached rank 2 in the men's doubles.

Achievements

BWF International Challenge/Series
Men's Doubles

 BWF International Challenge tournament
 BWF International Series tournament
 BWF Future Series tournament

References

External links
 

Malaysian male badminton players
Year of birth missing (living people)
Living people
Malaysian sportspeople of Chinese descent